Bob Gray (4 March 1943 – 5 September 2008) was  a former Australian rules footballer who played with Footscray in the Victorian Football League (VFL).

Notes

External links 
		

1943 births
2008 deaths
Australian rules footballers from Victoria (Australia)
Western Bulldogs players